Jenny Scheinman is a jazz violinist. She has produced several critically acclaimed solo albums, including 12 Songs, named one of the Top Ten Albums of 2005 by The New York Times. She has played with Linda Perry, Norah Jones, Nels Cline, Lou Reed, Ani Difranco, Bruce Cockburn, Aretha Franklin, Lucinda Williams, Bono, Bill Frisell, the Hot Club of San Francisco, and Allison Miller.

In 2008 Scheinman released a self-titled vocal album. She has also played with her friend, Sean Lennon, on the Late Show with David Letterman. Her playing is frequently used as soundbed for NPR programming. Her album Mischief & Mayhem features guitarist Nels Cline, drummer Jim Black, and bassist Todd Sickafoose.

She grew up in Petrolia, California, a remote area of Humboldt County near Cape Mendocino. She is the niece of robotics pioneer Victor Scheinman and the granddaughter of Telford Taylor, chief prosecutor at the United States war crimes trials at Nuremberg.

Discography
 Live at Yoshi's (Avant, 2000)
 The Rabbi's Lover (Tzadik, 2002)
 Shalagaster (Tzadik, 2004)
 12 Songs (Cryptogramophone, 2005)
 Crossing the Field (Koch, 2008)
 Jenny Scheinman (Koch, 2008)
 Mischief & Mayhem (self released, 2012)
 The Littlest Prisoner (Sony Masterworks, 2014)
 Here on Earth (RPF, 2017)

With Ani DiFranco
 Red Letter Year (Righteous Babe, 2008)
 Allergic To Water (Righteous Babe, 2014)

With Bill Frisell
 The Intercontinentals (Nonesuch, 2003)
 Unspeakable (Nonesuch, 2004)
 Richter 858 (Songlines, 2005)
 History, Mystery (Nonesuch, 2008)
 Disfarmer (Nonesuch, 2009)
 Sign of Life: Music for 858 Quartet (Savoy Jazz, 2010)
 All We Are Saying (Savoy Jazz, 2011)
 The Kentucky Derby Is Decadent and Depraved (Savoy Jazz, 2012)
 Big Sur (OKeh, 2013)

With Eyvind Kang
 The Narrow Garden (Ipecac, 2012)

With Christian McBride
 Live at Tonic (Ropeadope, 2006)

With Allison Miller
 Boom Tic Boom (Foxhaven, 2010)
 No Morphine, No Lilies (The Royal Potato Family, 2013)
 Otis Was a Polar Bear (The Royal Potato Family, 2016)
 Glitter Wolf (The Royal Potato Family, 2019)
 Parlour Game (The Royal Potato Family, 2019)

With Madeleine Peyroux
 Standing on the Rooftop (Decca, 2011)

With Lou Reed and Metallica
 Lulu (Warner Brothers/Vertigo 2011)

With Rova Saxophone Quartet
 Electric Ascension (Atavistic, 2005)

With Lucinda Williams
 West (Lost Highway, 2007)

References

External links
 Jenny Scheinman's Website
 2008 interview w/State of Mind
 NPR June 10, 2008

1973 births
Living people
American jazz violinists
People from Humboldt County, California
Jewish American musicians
Jewish jazz musicians
21st-century violinists
Jazz musicians from California
21st-century American Jews